In Polynesian mythology, Ira is the sky goddess and mother of the stars.

References

Polynesian goddesses
Sky and weather goddesses
Stellar goddesses